Francisco Díaz-Silveira Tamargo (Havana, 13 August 1936), known as Frank Diaz-Silveira, is a Cuban-American lawyer and politician, known as an anti-Castro Cuban militant. He was also an attorney in Florida and a former candidate for the Florida Senate, Mayor of Miami, Florida House of Representatives and Miami City Commission.

Family
Mr. Diaz-Silveira is the son of the imminent Abogado-Notario (attorney-notary) Francisco Diaz-Silveira Lopez and Ana Gloria Tamargo-Sanchez (sister of Margarita Tamargo-Sanchez). He is also the grandson of Francisco Diaz-Silveira and the second-cousin of prominent builder, Alonso J. del Portillo-Tamargo and the Cuban diplomat Modesto F. Fernandez Diaz-Silveira.  Mr. Diaz-Silveira was married to Adela Jaramillo-Mora and they had four children, Adela Jane (1962- ), Frank (1963- ), Alberto (1965- ), and Eddy (1969-).  He later married in 1986 Armantina Forns-Cuervo, but that marriage also ended in divorce in 1991. His son Eddy had two children. Krysten (1997-) and Gabriela (2000-).

Education
He received his law degree at the University of Havana in 1957 and then graduated in 1975 from the American Law Program at the University of Miami.

Anti-Castro activities
On November 16, 1960, Mr. Diaz-Silveira led a group of young Cubans to attack the Cuban Embassy in Lima, Peru; taking documents of the archives of the diplomatic seat.  On August 9, 1961, he was ejected from the Inter-American Economic and Social Conference for causing a fist fight and for interrupting a two-hour speech being given by Ernesto Guevara.

Political races
He first ran for office in 1975 for a seat on the City of Miami Commission, he lost. In 1976, he ran for the Florida House of Representatives, he lost.  On November 2, 1982 Mr. Diaz-Silveira received 20,077 votes out of 49,041 votes in the Florida Senate race of District 34, against the incumbent Joe Gersten and in 1983, he ran for Mayor of the City of Miami, which he lost again.

References

 Inside the Company: CIA Diary by Phillip Agee, (1975 Stonehill)
 Inter Cuba article 
 Cuba Exiles Call Casto Aide Assassin - Chicago Tribune, August 9, 1961
 Anuario Social de La Habana 1939, (Luz-Hilo, S.A.) 
 Directorio Social de La Habana 1948, (P. Fernandez y Cia, S. en C.) 
 Libro de Oro de la Sociedad Habanera 1949, (Editorial Lex) 
 Libro de Oro de la Sociedad Habanera 1950, (Editorial Lex) 
 Registro Social de La Habana 1958, (Molina y Cia, S.A.) 

1936 births
Living people
Opposition to Fidel Castro
Politicians from Miami
Florida lawyers
People from Havana
Cuban emigrants to the United States
Exiles of the Cuban Revolution in the United States